Aleksei Olegovich Kuvshinov (born 25 January 1992) is a Russian former football player.

Club career
He made his debut in the Russian Second Division for  FC KUZBASS Kemerovo on 2 May 2012 in a game against FC Chita.

He made his Russian Football National League debut for FC Sibir Novosibirsk on 11 October 2015 in a game against FC Arsenal Tula.

References

External links
 
 

1992 births
People from Kaltan
Living people
Russian footballers
FC Sibir Novosibirsk players
FC Sokol Saratov players
Association football midfielders
Association football forwards
Sportspeople from Kemerovo Oblast